Portland Independent Top Whitbed is the variety of Portland stone used to build the Ashton Memorial in Lancaster. It originates from Independent quarries on the Isle of Portland, Dorset, England.

See also
List of types of limestone

Limestone
Independent Top Whitbed
Geology of Dorset
Jurassic Coast